The 2001 U.S. Women's Open was the 56th U.S. Women's Open, held May 31 to June 3 at Pine Needles Lodge and Golf Club in Southern Pines, North Carolina. This was the second of four major championships on the LPGA Tour in 2001.

Defending champion Karrie Webb repeated as champion, eight strokes ahead of runner-up Se Ri Pak, the largest margin in 21 years. Webb became the seventh to win consecutive titles at the U.S. Women's Open, and the win was the fifth of her seven major titles.

Pine Needles previously hosted the championship in 1996 and it returned in 2007.

Course layout
Pine Needles Lodge and Golf Club

Past champions in the field

Made the cut

Source:

Missed the cut

Source:

Round summaries

First round
Thursday, May 31, 2001

Source:

Second round
Friday, June 1, 2001
Saturday, June 2, 2001

Source:

Third round
Saturday, June 2, 2001

Source:

Final round
Sunday, June 3, 2001

Source:

References

External links
U.S. Women's Open - past champions - 2001

U.S. Women's Open
Golf in North Carolina
Sports competitions in North Carolina
U.S. Women's Open
U.S. Women's Open
U.S. Women's Open
U.S. Women's Open
U.S. Women's Open
Women's sports in North Carolina